He Never Mentioned Love is an album by Claire Martin, released in 2007.

Critical reception
The Guardian wrote: "Having covered a lot of ground on her previous albums without demonstrating a convincing emotional range, here she ticks that final box and becomes the complete jazz singer she's always threatened to be."

Track listing
 "He Never Mentioned Love" (Curtis Reginald Lewis) – 5:08
 "Forget Me" (Valerie Brown Parks) – 3:59
 "Everything Must Change" (Benard Ighner) – 5:18
 "Trav'llin Light" (Johnny Mercer, Jimmy Mundy, Trummy Young) – 2:44
 "The Music That Makes Me Dance" (Bob Merrill, Jule Styne) – 6:11
 "All Night Long" (Curtis) – 3:41
 "If You Go" (Geoffrey Claremont Parsons, Michel Emer) – 4:57
 "A Song for You" (Leon Russell) – 4:59
 "Slowly But Shirley" (Laurence Cottle, Claire Martin) – 4:07
 "You're Nearer" (Lorenz Hart, Richard Rodgers) – 4:39
 "L.A. Breakdown" (Larry B. Marks) – 5:23
 "Slow Time" (Ian Shaw) – 4:09
 "The Sun Died" (Ray Charles, Hubert Giraud, Anne Gregory, Pierre LeRoye) – 5:26

Personnel
Claire Martin – vocal
Laurence Cottle- bass, producer

References

2007 albums
Claire Martin (singer) albums
Linn Records albums